Ruttya is a genus of plants in the family Acanthaceae. It includes the following species:

Ruttya bernieri Benoist 
Ruttya fragrans Benoist 
Ruttya fruticosa Lindau 
Ruttya ovata Harv.
Ruttya speciosa (Hochst.) Engl.
Ruttya tricolor Benoist

References
 Missouri Botanical Gardens - VAST (VAScular Tropicos) nomenclatural database

Acanthaceae
Acanthaceae genera